The Oklahoma Sheriff is a 1930 independent Western film directed by J.P. McGowan and starring Bob Steele.

Plot 
The film's plot centers around an Oklahoma sheriff who dislikes the man his daughter is set to marry. After a crooked deputy kills the sheriff in a robbery, the sheriff's daughter's boyfriend brings him to justice.

Cast 

 Bob Steele
 Jean Reno
 Perry Murdock
 Cliff Lyons
 Mack V. Wright
 Clark Comstock

Production 
According to reports from the time, star Bob Steele was taught how to ride and shoot by Native American tribesmen under the guidance of Chief White Bear.

References 

1930 films
1930 Western (genre) films
American Western (genre) films
Films set in Oklahoma
Films directed by J. P. McGowan
1930s American films